Trolltider ("Troll Times") was the Sveriges Television's Christmas calendar in 1979. It's one of the titles in the 2009 book Tusen svenska klassiker (2009).

Plot 
The series revolves around characters from folk tales of old times.

Episodes 
 Gläntan vaknar
 Gula solar och svarta
 Den flygande faran
 Feer kan inte ljuga
 Hemkomsten
 Tjo för vinden!
 En synlig, en osynlig
 Draken Eldtungas hämnd
 Förvandlingen
 Människor har för mycket
 Falska häxans skratt
 Häck Väck Våt Fläck
 Lucia, hår och stearin
 Tjo för livet!
 Trollsnuva och Vätteluva
 Muller från berget
 Viskande speglar
 Firulist och Firulara
 Hjältar och Hjältemod
 Bergatrollet gångar sig att sova
 Katastrofen
 När trollen samlas
 Trolleborgen
 Stilla natt

Reruns 
Reruns were aired in December 1985, and between 23 December 1994 – 25 January 1995.

A reboot is scheduled to be made in 2023.

References

External links 
  at SVT Play 
 

1979 Swedish television series debuts
1979 Swedish television series endings
Sveriges Television's Christmas calendar
Television shows set in Sweden